Izzy Lee is an American filmmaker and writer, known for her short films Re-Home (2019), The Obliteration of the Chickens (2019), My Monster (2018), and Innsmouth, which she produced through her company Nihil Noctem. She has written for multiple outlets such as Birth.Movies.Death, Rue Morgue, TwitchFilm, and Fangoria and has also helped program and curate film festivals like the Boston Underground and the Boston Sci-Fi Fest.

Lee began showing an interest in horror in kindergarten and later attended the Massachusetts College of Art and Design, where she received a BFA in illustration. She initially started as an actor and writer, but branched out into filmmaking in order to "see if I could do it". 

Lee started her filmmaking career in Massachusetts, where she was featured on WCVB Channel 5’s news show, Chronicle. in 2021. Lee has gained a following leading up to articles which shine a light on her talent as an up-and-coming director, such as "one of 10 female horror directors Blumhouse should hire" from The A.V. Club, as well as from author and film festival programmer Alexandra Heller-Nicholas, who stated that "...Izzy Lee... is going to be massive once she gets the break that she deserves" in Entertainment Weekly.

Lee often works with socio-political themes in horror and thrillers, as well as cult or weird genres. Lee's first short film, Legitimate, was released in 2013 and was partially inspired by Representative Todd Akin's comments about "legitimate" rape. The following year Lee directed a trailer, Come Out and Play, for Christopher Golden's 2014 novel Snowblind. In 2015 Lee released Innsmouth, which was inspired by the works of H. P. Lovecraft, particularly The Shadow over Innsmouth. The short received some media attention for Lee's choice to feature a predominantly female cast, which she did in order to "make [Lovecraft] roll over in his grave a little by having the cast 98% female and switching the gender roles.”
Her short film Re-Home (2019) started as a reaction to the promise of a wall built between the United States and Mexico. Lee has also tackled abuse within the Catholic Church with Rites of Vengeance (2017) and revenge porn with For A Good Time, Call... (2017).

In 2023, her short film, Meat Friend starring Marnie McKendry (daughter of fellow horror filmmakers Rebekah and David McKendry), Megan Duffy, and Steve Johanson, was nominated for Best Short by Fangoria for their annual Chainsaw Awards.

The filmmaker often casts other directors in her short films, such as: Gigi Saul Guerrero in Re-Home; Brea Grant and Daniel Isn't Real director, Adam Egypt Mortimer in My Monster; Silvia Graziano and The Ranger producer Heather Buckley in Rites of Vengeance; and Sophia Cacciola in Innsmouth. The author Bracken MacLeod provided the voiceover for the experimental, Werner Herzog-influenced The Obliteration of the Chickens (2019), while Lee herself narrated Disco Graveyard (2020).

Filmography

References

External links
 
 
 Interview at (re)Search My Trash
 Interview at Cinedelphia
 Interview at Women in Horror Month
 Interview at Cinema Crazed

American film directors
American film producers
American women screenwriters
21st-century American actresses
Year of birth missing (living people)
Living people
American women film producers